"Shady Love" is a song by American pop band Scissor Sisters which features front-man Jake Shears' pseudonym Krystal Pepsy and uncredited vocals from Harlem rapper Azealia Banks. The song was set for release in the United Kingdom on February 12, 2012 as the lead single from the band's fourth studio album (2012), but the release was cancelled for unconfirmed reasons. The track was written by frontman Jake Shears, Azealia Banks and was produced by Alex Ridha (who also co-wrote the song). "Shady Love" received its first play on January 2 by BBC Radio 1 DJ Annie Mac and was met with positive reviews, including NME who described it as "the first big hit of 2012".

The band did release the song as a 12-inch single, but to 300 of their Twitter and Facebook fans.

Background
Talking about the song, Babydaddy stated: "It's a song we had fun making so while it wasn't necessarily true to the direction of the album or what most people might think of as Scissors, we thought it would be good to just get out there in between albums."

Music video
A music video to accompany the release of "Shady Love" was first released onto YouTube on January 2, 2012 at a total length of four minutes and forty-one seconds. The video depicts a group of school children putting on a play, all lipsynching to the song.

Track listing

Release history

References

External links
 

2011 songs
Scissor Sisters songs
Azealia Banks songs
Songs written by Jake Shears
Songs written by Azealia Banks
Songs written by Babydaddy